Kasba is an upazila of Brahmanbaria District, Chittagong Division in east-central Bangladesh. Kasba is located approximately 150 km north of Chittagong. It was part of greater Comilla District until 1984.

History
Present-day Kasba was formerly known as Kailagarh, which was said to have been a corruption of Qilagarh wherein qila referred to an army cantonment and garh referred to a fort. The area was later renamed to Kasba, a common place name that is used in the Muslim world to refer to a medina quarter or citadel.

Geography
Kasba is located in southeast Brahmanbaria District. Kasba is bordered by Akhaura Upazila, Brahmanbaria Sadar Upazila and Nabinagar Upazila to the north, Brahmanpara Upazila to the south, Tripura State of India to the east, and Nabinagar, Muradnagar and Brahmanpara Upazilas to the west. The geography of the upazila is characterized by low-lying land with small hills and hillocks of red soil.

Demographics
As of the 2011 Bangladesh Census, there were 319,221 inhabitants across 60,919 households in Kasba Upazila. There were 91 males (47.6%) to every 100 females (52.4%). Children (0-14) made up 42.4% of the population. The vast majority of the population were adherents of Islam (95.7%), with 4.3% being adherents of Hinduism. The average literacy rate was 50.7% for those aged 7 and above, compared to a national average of 47.1%. The average age at first marriage for males was 24.4 years and 19.8 years for females.

According to the 1991 Bangladesh census, Kasba had a population of 243833. Males constituted 50.69% of the population, and females 49.31%. The majority of the population was Muslim (94.59%), with Hindus at 5.40% and others at 0.01%. The population aged 18 or over was 112,611. Kasba had an average literacy rate of 30.7% (7+ years), compared to the national average of 32.4%.

Administration
The administration for Kasba was founded in 1908 as a police station and upgraded to an upazila (Sub-District) in 1983.

Kasba Upazila is divided into Kasba Municipality and ten union parishads: Badair, Benauty, Bayek, Gopinathpur, Kasba Paschim, Kayempur, Kharera, Kuti, Mehari, and Mulagram. The union parishads are subdivided into 136 mauzas and 209 villages.

Kasba Municipality is subdivided into 9 wards and 34 mahallas.

The chairman of Kasba Upazila Parishad is advocate Anisul  Haque Bhuiyan.

National Assembly (parliament) seat no. 246-Brahmanbaria-4 (Current MP, Advocate Anisul Haq, Minister of Law).

Education 

There are eight colleges in the upazila. They include Adarsha Degree College, Chargas N.I. Bhuyan Degree College, Gopinathpur Al-Haj Shah Alam College, Kalsher Nayeema Alam Mohila College, Kasba Mohila Degree College, Kasba T. Ali Degree College, and Mia Abdullah Wazed Women's Degree College.

According to Banglapedia, Jamsherpur High School, founded in 1923, Kasba Government High School (1899), Kheora Anandamayee High School (1975), and Kuti Atal Bihari High School (1918),Chandidwar High School(1948) are notable secondary schools.

There are many Primary & K.G School in kasba upazilla including Majlishpur Govt. Primary School & Sunmoon Kinder Garten.
The madrasa education system includes one fazil madrasa. It is Purquil Gausiya Habibiya Fazil Madrasa.

Notable people
Anisul Huq, Law Minister of Bangladesh
Hasnat Abdul Hye, writer and novelist
Muhammed Abul Manzur, military officer
Serajul Huq, politician
 Tafazzal Ali , politician , 
 Liaquat Ali , politician

See also
Upazilas of Bangladesh
Districts of Bangladesh
Divisions of Bangladesh

References 

Upazilas of Brahmanbaria District